Andrzej Gromala (born 14 December 1978), better known by his stage name Gromee, is a Polish DJ, record producer, remixer and owner of Kingztown Music. In 2016 he signed a record deal with Sony Music. At the Eska Music Awards 2017 he won the award for Best DJ/Producer.

He won the Polish national final for the Eurovision Song Contest 2018 in Lisbon, Portugal. Together with Swedish singer Lukas Meijer, he represented his home country at the Eurovision Song Contest 2018 in Lisbon with the song "Light Me Up" becoming the first DJ in history to perform at the Eurovision Song Contest.

His solo projects have included Andreas Moe, known for being part of Tiesto's or Hardwell's tracks.
He has performed at numerous music festivals. In April 2016 Gromee was the support act for Mariah Carey’s first ever Polish concert. His 2016 summer single "Fearless" reached 10th position on the radio and 2nd position on the TV Airplay Chart and earning a Platinum Record award. His next single, "Spirit", recorded together with Mahan Moin, was his first no. 1 on the Polish Radio Airplay Chart.

In 2018, he married Sara Chmiel.

In 2019, he wrote the theme song for the Junior Eurovision Song Contest 2019 in Gliwice, Poland, "Share the Joy". He also wrote the theme song for Junior Eurovision Song Contest 2020 in Warsaw, Poland, as well as composing the Polish entry, "I'll Be Standing", sung by Ala Tracz.

Discography

Studio albums

Extended plays

Singles

As lead artist

References

Living people
1978 births
Polish DJs
Polish record producers
Musicians from Kraków
Eurovision Song Contest entrants for Poland
Eurovision Song Contest entrants of 2018